The 2004–05 NBA season was the Grizzlies' tenth season in the National Basketball Association, and their fourth season in Memphis. Coming off their first playoff appearance in franchise history, the Grizzlies had a new look and moved into their new arena, the FedExForum. However, the team struggled with a 5–7 start as 71-year old Hubie Brown retired from coaching due to "unexpected health problems". The Grizzlies would lose their next four games under Lionel Hollins before replacing him with TNT analyst Mike Fratello. Under Fratello, the Grizzlies would win 12 of their 15 games in January climbing back into playoff contention. Despite losing five of their last six games, the Grizzlies finished fourth in the Southwest Division with a 45–37 record, making their second consecutive trip to the playoffs. 

However, in the first round of the playoffs, they were swept by the top-seeded Phoenix Suns in four straight games. Following the season, Bonzi Wells was traded to the Sacramento Kings, Jason Williams and James Posey were both dealt to the Miami Heat, and Stromile Swift signed as a free agent with the Houston Rockets.

For this season, they added new logo and new uniforms replacing teal, brown, red and black and with blue, navy, yellow and grey to their color scheme, added side panels to their jerseys and shorts, they remained in used until 2018.

Draft picks

Roster

Regular season

Season standings

z – clinched division title
y – clinched division title
x – clinched playoff spot

Record vs. opponents

Game log

Playoffs

|- bgcolor=ffcccc
| 1
| April 24
| @ Phoenix
| L 103–114
| Mike Miller (19)
| Shane Battier (9)
| Jason Williams (5)
| America West Arena18,422
| 0–1
|- bgcolor=ffcccc
| 2
| April 27
| @ Phoenix
| L 103–108
| Pau Gasol (28)
| Pau Gasol (16)
| Pau Gasol (5)
| America West Arena18,422
| 0–2
|- bgcolor=ffcccc
| 3
| April 29
| Phoenix
| L 90–110
| Lorenzen Wright (14)
| three players tied (8)
| Jason Williams (6)
| FedExForum18,119
| 0–3
|- bgcolor=ffcccc
| 4
| May 1
| Phoenix
| L 115–123
| Pau Gasol (28)
| Dahntay Jones (5)
| Jason Williams (8)
| FedExForum17,243
| 0–4
|-

Player statistics

Season

Playoffs

Awards and records

Transactions

References

See also
2004–05 NBA season

Memphis Grizzlies seasons
Memphis
Memphis Grizzlies
Memphis Grizzlies
Events in Memphis, Tennessee